Pool B of the 2015 Fed Cup Americas Group II was one of four pools in the Americas Group II of the 2015 Fed Cup. Three teams competed in a round robin competition, with each team proceeding to their respective sections of the play-offs: the top team played for advancement to the Group I.

Standings

Round-robin

Bahamas vs. Trinidad and Tobago

Costa Rica vs. Trinidad and Tobago

Bahamas vs. Costa Rica

References

External links 
 Fed Cup website

2015 Fed Cup Americas Zone